The Vilnius International Film Festival (VIFF) Kino pavasaris is a film festival held annually in March in Vilnius, Lithuania since 1995, and is the largest film festival in the nation in number of films and audience. It is one of the most anticipated annual cultural events in Lithuania.

Vilnius International Film Festival Kino Pavasaris is the biggest and most important cinema event in Lithuania. Over more than 20 years, the festival has become a highly attended cultural phenomenon. In 2017, it attracted 114 250 members of audience in 5 Lithuanian cities. This year, Vilnius IFF will take place in 11 cities over two weeks.

The festival's main venue is Forum Cinemas Vingis, with  additional screenings taking place at the local art film theatre SKALVIJA, cinema boutique "Pasaka" and at the shopping mall "Akropolis" at "Forum Cinemas Akropolis". Some screenings are shown in the second largest city of Lithuania - Kaunas at local "Forum Cinemas" centre. And from 2018 Vilnius IFF  took place in 11 cities over two weeks.

History
The festival was founded in 1995 at the cinema Lietuva. Festival director Vida Ramaškienė.

After the 2002 festival the venue Lietuva was sold to private investors. As a result, the festival did not happen in 2003.

In 2004 the festival got the first donation from the European Commission. Festival's programme becomes more independent and Edvinas Pukšta with Jurga Stakėnaitė started making festival's film programme.

In 2006 the festival changed its location to Forum Cinemas Vingis in Naujamiestis.

In 2018, Vilnius IFF presented 112 feature and 56 short films, including 12 Lithuanian premieres. Like always, the festival has selected strong debuts and works from masters of film. The large programme has been divided into 5 categories: Discoveries, Festivals' Favourites, Masters, Critics' Choice, and Competition of European Debuts.

Programmes

Since 2009, the festival's competition programmes have become our phenomenal calling card for international film industry professionals, and a great educational tool for festivalgoers. This year, films from debuting European directors will take part in the Competition of European Debuts.

Vilnius International Film Festival is organised in various sections:

Competition programmes:

 New Europe – New Names (since 2009), the films are assessed by an international jury of cinema industry professionals: actors, directors, programme directors, cinematographers and producers. The jury selects the best film of the festival and awards it two special prizes.
 Baltic Gaze (since 2014), the idea of this competition programme is to satisfy growing interest of Baltic region cinematography. The films are assessed by the international jury of the cinema industry professionals. The jury will select the best film of this programme and award it with solid monetary prize.

Other programmes:

 Short films. Competition
 Discoveries
 Festivals' favourites
 Masters
 Critics' choice
 VIASAT comedies
 Documentaries
 Retrospective, each year a different director or/and a topic is selected.
 American Independents
 New Russian Cinema
 Culinary films
 Films for Family
 Lithuanian films. Premiers
 Lithuanian films
 Lithuanians Abroad
 Short films
2018 Vilnius IFF will also be the first Lithuanian festival to welcome members of the prestigious FIPRESCI association, who will award one director from the Baltic region their prize. The FIPRESCI Prize is significant proof of the festival's quality being recognized on an international level.

Industry event "Meeting Point - Vilnius"

International film industry professionals meet in Vilnius to discuss hot topics of today's and tomorrow's audiovisual world. The highlight of the industry event is the presentation of Lithuanian and Baltic film industry.

Awards at Vilnius International Film Festival

The Audience Award
The oldest and one of the most important award of VIFF.

 2004: Spring, Summer, Fall, Winter... and Spring, directed by Kim Ki-duk 
 2005: 3-Iron (Bin-jip), directed by Kim Ki-duk 
 2006: The Method, directed by Marcelo Piñeyro 
 2007: The Lives of Others, directed by Florian Henckel von Donnersmarck 
 2008: 4 Months, 3 Weeks & 2 Days, directed by Cristian Mungiu 
 2009: Camino, directed by Javier Fesser 
 2010: Departures, directed by Yōjirō Takita 
 2011: Incendies, directed by Denis Villeneuve 
 2012: The Intouchables, directed by Olivier Nakache and Éric Toledano 
 2013: Searching for Sugar Man, directed by Malik Bendjelloul 
 2014: Omar, directed by Hany Abu-Assad 
 2015: Mommy, directed by Xavier Dolan  
 2016: Truman, directed by Cesc Gay  
 2017: Perfect Strangers, directed by Paolo Genovese  
 2018: Loving Vincent, directed by Dorota Kobiela  and Hugh Welchman  
 2019: Capernaum, directed by Nadine Labaki 
 2020: Corpus Christi (Boże Ciało), directed by Jan Komasa

The Audience Award (Lithuanian film)
Introduced in 2011.

 2011: Book smuggler, directed by Jonas Trukanas
 2012: The Last Day of the Honeymoon, directed by Rokas Eltermanas
 2013: The Swimmer, directed by Gabrielė Urbonaitė
 2014: The Invisible Front, directed by Vincas Sruoginis and Jonas Ohman
 2015: Life Is Sacred, directed by Andreas Dalsgaard, Nicolas Servide and Vivana Gomez
 2016: Junction, directed by Nathan Jurevicius
 2017: Woman and the Glacier, directed by Andrius Stonys
 2018: 100 Years Together, directed by Edita Kabaraitė
 2019: Summer Survivors, directed by Marija Kavtaradzė
 2015: - no award

The Audience Award (Short film)
Introduced in 2013.

 2013: Buzkashi Boys, directed by Sam French 
 2014: Kush, directed by Shubhashish Bhutiani 
 2015: - no award
 2016: Otto, directed by Marieke Blaauw , Joris Oprins , Job Roggeveen 
 2017: Running Lights, directed by Gediminas Šiaulys 
 2018: Mother, directed by Rodrigo Sorogoyen 
 2019: Family Unit, directed by Titas Laucius 
 2015: - no award

Short Film Competition
Best short film, selected by a jury from short competition programme. Introduced in 2012.

 2012: Beast (Csicka), directed by Attila Till 
 2013: The Whistle (Gwizdek), directed by Grzegorz Zariczny 
 2014: Pandas, directed by Matus Vizar 
 2015: Symphony No. 42, directed by Réka Bucsi 
 2016: Fear, directed by Michal Blaško 
 2017: Close Ties, directed by Zofia Kowalewska 
 2018: By The Pool, directed by Laurynas Bareiša 
 2019: In Between, directed by Samir Karahoda 
 2020: Journey Through a Body, directed by Camille Degeye

European Debut Competition
Introduced in 2018

Jury
 2018: Homayoun Ershadi, Audrius Stonys, Dagnė Vildžiūnaitė, Elad Samorzik, Kathleen Mclnnis
 2019: Cosima Finkbeiner, Eglė Vertelytė, Marcin Pienkowski, Mark Peranson, Takeo Hisamatsu
 2020: Rugilė Barzdžiukaitė, Evgeny Gusyatinskiy, Boyd van Hoeij, Jonas Holmberg, Katarzyna Sinarska

Best Actress
 2018: Darya Zhovner , film Closeness
 2019: ?, film Journey To Mother's Room
 2020: Roxanne Scrimshaw , Nichola Burley , film Lynn + Lucy

Best Director
 2018: Bertrand Mandico , film The Wild Boys
 2019: Zsófia Szilágyi , film One Day
 2020: Fyzal Boulifa , film Lynn + Lucy

Best Actor
 2018: Elliott Crosset Hove , film Winter Brothers
 2019: Paulius Markevičius , film Summer Survivors
 2020: Jérémie Laheurte , Djanis Bouzyani , Anthony Bajon , film You Deserve a Lover

Best Film
 2018: Winter Brothers, directed by Hlynur Pálmason 
 2019: Ray & Liz, directed by Richard Billingham 
 2020: The Metamorphosis of Birds, directed by Catarina Vasconcelos 

CINEUROPE Prize
 2019: Animus Animalis (A Story About People, Animals And Things), directed by Aistė Žegulytė 
 2020: Nova Lituania, directed by Karolis Kaupinis

Retired Awards

Competition programme "New Europe – New Names"
Introduced 2009 - 2018 Retired
The main awards at Vilnius International Film Festival. Introduced in 2009. Chosen by the international jury of the cinema industry professionals: actors, directors, programme directors, cinematographers and producers. The jury will select the best film of the festival and award it with two special prizes.

Best Film
 2009: The World Is Big and Salvation Lurks Around the Corner, directed by Stefan Kitanov 
 2010: Eastern Plays, directed by Kamen Kalev 
 2011: Outbound (Periferic), directed by Bogdan George Apetri 
 2012: Courage, directed by Grzegorz Zgliński 
 2013: Loving (Miłość), directed by Slawomir Fabicki 
 2014: Japanese Dog, directed by Tudor Cristian Jurgiu 
 2015: Koza, directed by Ivan Ostrochovský 
 2016 >1: I, Olga Hepnarová, directed by Petr Kazda  and Tomáš Weinreb 
 2016 >2: Thirst, directed by Svetla Tsotsorkova 
 2017: The Last Family, directed by Ostatnia Rodzina 

Best Director
Introduced 2009 - 2018 Retired
 2009: Javor Gardev 
 2010: - no award
 2011: - no award
 2012: Adrian Sitaru , film Best Intentions
 2013: Mira Fornay , film My Dog Killer, 
 2014: Levan Koguashvili , film Blind Dates (Brma paemnebi)
 2015: Myroslav Slaboshpytskiy , film The Tribe
 2016: Agnieszka Smoczyńska , film The Lure
 2017: Kristina Grozeva and Petar Valchanov , film Glory,

Best Actors
Introduced 2009 - 2018 Retired
 2009: Miki Manojlovic , film The World Is Big and Salvation Lurks Around the Corner
 2010: Vlad Ivanov , film Police, Adjective
 2011: Bartu Kucukcaglayan , film Majority
 2012 >1: Anjela Nedyalkova , film Avé
 2012 >2: Ada Condeescu , film Loverboy
 2012 >3: Isidora Simijonovic , film Clip
 2013: Dan Chiorean , film Rocker
 2014: Actor: Igor Samobor , film Class Enemy. Actress: Michaela Bendulova , film Miracle
 2015: Actor: Márton Kristóf , film Afterlife. Actress: Margita Gosheva , film The Lesson
 2016: Actor: Uliks Fehmiu , film Our Everyday Life. Actress: Monika Naydenova , film Thirst
 2017: Actor: Marius Repšys , film The Saint. Actress: Mia Petričević , film Quit Staring at My Plate

CICAE jury film award
Introduced 2009 - 2018 Retired
 2009: - no award
 2010: Eastern Plays, directed by Kamen Kalev 
 2011: On the Path, directed by Jasmila Žbanić 
 2012: director Adrian Sitaru , film Best Intentions
 2013: Keep Smiling (Gaigimet), directed by Rusudan Chkonia
 2014: director Rok Biček , film Class Enemy
 2015: Ivan Ostrochovský , film Koza 2016: Mirjana Karanović , film A Good Wife
 2017: film Glory 

Special award
 2010: Protector, directed by Marek Najbrt  (for creative excellence)
 2011: The House, directed by Zuzana Liová

Competition programme "Baltic Gaze"
Introduced 2014 - 2018 Retired

Best Film
 2014: The Hope Factory, directed by Natalia Meshaninova 
 2015: Victoria, directed by Sebastian Schipper 
 2016: Under the Sun, directed by Vitaly Mansky 
 2017: Woman and the Glacier, directed by Andrius Stonys 

Best Director
 2014: Paweł Pawlikowski , film Ida
 2015: Joshua Oppenheimer , film The Look of Silence
 2016: Mantas Kvedaravičius , film Mariupolis
 2017: Sergei Loznitsa , film Austerlitz

Best Actor
 2014: Lauri Lagle , film Free Range
 2015: Janusz Gajos , film Body
 2016: Oleg Maximov , film Don Juan
 2017: Petr Skvortsov , film The Student

Best Actress
 2014: Alexandra Finder , film The Police Officer's Wife
 2015: Bianca Kronlöf -, film Underdog (Svenskjävel)
 2016: Trine Dyrholm , film The Commune
 2017: Lene Cecilia Sparrok , film Sami Blood

Special mention
 2014: - no mention
 2015: Rocks in My Pockets directed by Signe Baumane 
 2016: Granny's Dancing on the Table directed by Hanna Sköld 
 2017: - no mention

Best Lithuanian Actress
Introduced by L'oreal Paris in 2007 as "Lithuanian star", discontinued after 2010. Revived in 2012 as "Best Lithuanian Actress" with new sponsor Bourjois.

 2007: Nelė Savičenko
 2008: Larisa Kalpokaitė
 2009: Gabija Ryškuvienė
 2010: Edita Užaitė
 2011: - no award
 2012: Toma Vaškevičiūtė
 2013: Valda Bičkutė
 2014: Jurgita Jurkutė
 2015: Aistė Diržiūtė
 2016: Viktorija Kuodytė

Best Lithuanian Actor
Introduced in 2014.

 2014: Giedrius Savickas
 2015: Marius Repšys
 2016: Juozas Budraitis

Lithuanian debut
Introduced in 2010.

 2010: Lernavan, directed by Marat Sargsyan
 2011: Barzakh, directed by Mantas Kvedaravičius
 2012: A Place We Call Home, directed by Albina Griniūtė
 2013: The Bomb, directed by Robertas Nevecka
 2014: The Etude, directed by Austėja Urbaitė
 2015: Fellow Travelers (Pakeliaiviai), directed by Linas Mikuta
 2016 - no award

Special award. Since 2013 award of Saulius Macaitis

 2012: Infinite Minutes (Vegtelen percek), directed by Cecilia Felméri 
 2013: No, directed by Pablo Larraín 
 2014: Norte, the End of History, directed by Lav Diaz 
 2015: Timbuktu, directed by Abderrahmane Sissako 
 2016: The Pearl Button, directed by Patricio Guzmán

Special award for best film translations
 2014: Ieva Mažeikaitė and Goda Lūčiūnienė
 2015: Andrius Patiomkinas

References

External links
Official site

Film festivals in Lithuania
1995 establishments in Lithuania
Tourist attractions in Vilnius
Film festivals established in 1995
Spring (season) events in Lithuania
Lithuanian culture-related lists
Annual events in Lithuania
Events in Vilnius